The 1937–38 Duke Blue Devils men's basketball team represented Duke University during the 1937–38 men's college basketball season. The head coach was Eddie Cameron, coaching his 10th season with the Blue Devils. The team finished with an overall record of 15–9.

References 

Duke Blue Devils men's basketball seasons
Duke
1937 in sports in North Carolina
1938 in sports in North Carolina